Willi Hoffmann was a German weightlifter. He competed in the men's middleweight event at the 1928 Summer Olympics.

References

Year of birth missing
Year of death missing
German male weightlifters
Olympic weightlifters of Germany
Weightlifters at the 1928 Summer Olympics
Place of birth missing
20th-century German people